Pionieri  was a monthly magazine published in communist Albania, by the Pioneers of Enver organization, also called Central Committee of the Union of Albanian Working Youth. The magazine, although politicized, is remembered to have influenced scientific formation of the Albanian youth, with relevant translations from analogous foreign magazines.

At age 12, Ismail Kadare wrote his first short stories, which were published in the Pionieri journal in Tirana.

References

1991 disestablishments in Albania
Communism in Albania
Magazines published in Albania
Albanian-language magazines
Defunct magazines published in Albania
Eastern Bloc mass media
Magazines established in 1945
Magazines disestablished in 1991
Marxist magazines
Monthly magazines
Socialist magazines
Youth magazines